Gangloffsömmern is a municipality in the Sömmerda district of Thuringia, Germany.

People born in Gangloffsömmern
Heinrich von Brühl, Polish-Saxon statesman

References

Sömmerda (district)